Duke Cheng of Qi (died 795 BC) was from 803 to 795 BC the eleventh recorded ruler of the State of Qi during the Western Zhou Dynasty of ancient China.  His personal name was Lü Yue (呂說), ancestral name Jiang (姜), and Duke Cheng was his posthumous title.

Duke Cheng succeeded his father Duke Wen of Qi, who died in 804 BC, as ruler of Qi.  He reigned for 9 years and died in 795 BC.  He was succeeded by his son, Duke Zhuang I of Qi.

Family
Sons:
 Prince Gou (d. 731 BC), ruled as Duke Zhuang I of Qi from 794–731 BC

Ancestry

References

Year of birth unknown
Monarchs of Qi (state)
9th-century BC Chinese monarchs
8th-century BC Chinese monarchs
795 BC deaths